Yes, I Have No 4 Beat Today - Toshiko Akiyoshi with Brazilian Friends is a jazz album recorded by pianist Toshiko Akiyoshi in 1995 and released by Nippon Crown Records.

Track listing 
"Once I Loved" (Jobim) – 8:42 
"Pollination" (Akiyoshi) – 7:22 
"Tico Tico" (Abreu, Drake, Oliveira) – 3:33 
"Air" (Bach) – 6:18
"One Note Samba" (Jobim) – 5:57 
"Star Eyes" (Raye, De Paul) – 8:17 
"Amapola" (LaCalle, Roldan, Gamse) – 5:30 
"Warning, Success May Be Hazardous To Your Health" (Akiyoshi) – 6:22

Personnel
Toshiko Akiyoshi – piano 
Lincoln Goines – bass 
Duduka da Fonseca – drums 
Valtinho Anastacio – percussion 
Ivo Araujo – percussion (surdo, chocalho, repinique)
Scott Wendholdt – trumpet
Scott Whitfield – trombone
Ray Stewart – tuba
Lew Tabackin – flute (Track 8) 
Roberta Cooper – cello

References
Nippon Crown CRCJ-91007  
Yes, I Have No 4 Beat Today at [ Allmusic.com]

External links
album review (in Japanese) & personnel listing

Toshiko Akiyoshi albums
1995 albums